is a biography series produced by Tsuburaya Productions. This show follows a format similar to Ultraman Retsuden and Ultraman Zero: The Chronicle, featuring Gai Kurenai, the alter ego of the titular character Ultraman Orb navigating the viewers to the Ultraman Orb series, including other spin-offs and adaptations that featured Gai as the main character. The show aired on January 6, 2018, on the Japanese television network TV Tokyo at the time of 9:00 am.

Episodes

Cast
: 
: 
: 
Voice of light (26):

Songs
Opening theme

Lyrics & Composition: 
Arrangement: Toshihiko Takamizawa with 
Artists:  with 
Starting from Episode 8, May J. joins in the original artist to sing the opening theme.

Insert theme
"HERO"
Lyrics: May J., Risa Horie
Composition: May J., Sho Kamijo
Arrangement: Sho Kamijo
Artist: May J.

References

External links
Ultraman Orb The Chronicle at TV Tokyo 

2018 Japanese television series debuts
2018 Japanese television series endings
TV Tokyo original programming
Ultra television series